Financial Management Company Ltd (FIMACO) was a Jersey company founded in 1990.

The company has gained fame as a result of a series of scandals related to the IMF loan funds, operations on the Russian debt market and the issue of obtaining commission income from operations with the state currency reserve. The company has also been the subject of analysis as part of investigations into the fate of party financial resources of the Communist Party.

Introduction
According to Fritz W. Ermarth, the "Saga of the KGB Money" began before the breakup of the Soviet Union. Ermarth stated that top-level Communist Party of the Soviet Union (CPSU) officials gave instructions: "Using semi-private cooperatives, the KGB sold cheaply acquired Soviet commodities abroad at world prices, putting the proceeds into disguised foreign accounts and front companies" beginning in the mid-1980s. For example, Paul Klebnikov explained that Marc Rich was the mentor to the 1990s looters of Russia. Before the 1990s to trade between the West and the Soviet Union, Rich established a trading house in Switzerland for each commodity to be traded: oil, aluminum, zinc, chromium, steel, etc. Each trading house had a monopoly on the trade for its commodity between the Soviet Union and the West and would purchase the commodity from the Soviet producers for only 5% to 10% of its market value then sell the commodity through its Swiss trading house at market value and pocket the difference. Marc Rich's firm Nordex followed this scheme. Ermarth stated, "Initially the KGB objective was simply commercial cover. But the program evolved into operating businesses for off-budget revenues, and from there into avenues for squirreling away funds for the safe retirement or political comeback of embattled communist leaders. Lines of business came to include money laundering, arms and drug trafficking, and other plainly criminal activities. Before long, intelligence, business, politics and crime blurred indistinguishably into each other." In the 1990s, the looting of Russia followed a similar scheme and, by 1993, the looters muscled Marc Rich out of commodities trading. Ermarth stated that the Soviet Union was engaging in this scheme in 1985 and, in the 1990s, Russia had many that were "squirreling away funds for the safe retirement or political comeback of embattled communist leaders."

History
On August 23, 1990, a secret memorandum from Vladimir A. Ivashko, who was Gorbachev's deputy general secretary, outlined strategies to hide the Communist Party's assets through Russian and international joint ventures because Boris Yeltsin, who was the new president of the Russian Republic in the Soviet Union, wanted to levy taxes on the Communist Party's vast administrative property holdings and on the Party itself. The memorandum was to organize the transfer of CPSU funds, CPSU financing and support of its operations through associations, ventures, foundations, etc. which are to act as invisible economics. In November 1990, the offshore structure Fimaco was formed by documents signed by Yury Ponomaryov under the direction of V. Gerashchenko of the Russian Central Bank, then known as Gosbank, to hide these funds. In November 1990, Leonid Veselovsky, a colonel in the First Chief Directorate of the KGB and an expert in international economics, was transferred from his KGB post in Portugal to Moscow to be under deputy chairman of the KGB of the USSR Philip Bobkov; however, two weeks before the August Putsch in 1991, Veselovsky quit the KGB and began working for the Switzerland office of Boris Birshtein's Seabeco; but, in the meantime, hundreds of banks, joint stock companies, and joint ventures had been created under the direction of the CPSU Central Committee.

According to Sergei Tretyakov, KGB chief Vladimir Kryuchkov sent US$50 billion worth of funds of the Communist Party to an unknown location in the lead up to the collapse of the USSR.

Russian officials claimed that FIMACO was 100% owned by the state-owned Banque Commerciale pour l'Europe du Nord, but never provided any proof according to a Newsweek article in March 1999.

From 1989 to 1998, Yury Ponomaryov was the CEO and chairman of the board at the Commercial Bank for Northern Europe (BCEN) - Eurobank in Paris; from 1993, he was chairman of the board of directors of the Moscow bank "Evrofinance" which was a subsidiary of Eurobank; and during 1998 to 1999, he was chairman of the board of the Moscow Narodny Bank in London (MNB). Ponomaryov was the principal executor during the privatization of funds of international financial organizations and state foreign exchange reserves of Russia through FIMACO and other shadow companies. BCEN - Eurobank had numerous correspondent accounts with Western banks to secure lines of credit for facilitating financial flows from the Soviet Union and later Russia to both the West and also less developed countries.

In 1990 Alexander Mamut founded the "ALM-Consulting" law firm (ALM abbreviated after Mamut's name) and served as Managing Partner from 1990 to 1993. In 1991, ALM Consulting partnered with Frere Cholmeley Bischoff, a law firm based in London and headed by Tim Razzall from 1990 to 1994, to establish many offshore shell companies with support from ALM Consulting. In 1993, Mamut hired Igor Shuvalov as a senior advisor and instructed Shuvalov to establish many offshore companies to conduct special assignments to money launder very large amounts of cash away from Russia. In 1995 when Shuvalov was the head of ALM, Mamut introduced Shuvalov to Roman Abramovich, Alisher Usmanov, and Oleg Boyko who established Shuvalov's first investment which was in a business associated with Boyko. ALM was the preferred law firm for Russian oligarchs during the 1990s including Alisher Usmanov, Roman Abramovich, Boris Berezovsky, Oleg Boyko, and others. During the 1990s, Mikhail Kasyanov, while he was the head of the department of external loans and foreign debt at the Russian Ministry of Finance, made decisions in support of Mamut.

In Autumn 1990, Vladislav Surkov established an advertising company with support from Menatep Bank that achieved tremendous return on investments. With offices in Paris, Gibraltar, Budapest, and Geneva, Mikhail Khodorkovsky's MENATAP united a trading house, 2 insurance companies, 18 independent commercial banks, and about 30 industrial and other enterprises according to Delovoy Mir on 8 June 1991. Organized by the Russian Ministry of Finance, MENATEP proposed methods of privatization and ways to secure foreign funds and support for securities.

They had opened a currency exchange at their Riga train station tourism office, previously on 3 April 1991. He along with Viktor Krasovitsky and Krasovitsky's wife Nina Kontratyeva later founded Parex Bank in January 1992. Riga was intended to become the global financial center in the former Soviet Union and Parex promoted itself as "We are closer than Switzerland!"

In a 1991 report, former KGB colonel Veselovsky, whose responsibility was to manage Communist Party commercial affairs overseas, explained that he had found ways to funnel party money abroad. In addition to Nikolai Kruchina and Viktor Geraschenko, Russian prosecutors also considered Veselovsky to be a principal figure in the money transfers. The stated goal was to ensure the financial well-being of party leaders after they lost power.
Large amounts of state assets were transferred through FIMACO. One estimate is about US$50 billion. Alexander Litvinenko stated that millions from the IMF loan went to Russian mafia. On 30 September 1991, Yevgeny Primakov became the head of foreign espionage or the KGB First Chief Directorate (FCD) which in December 1991 became the SVR which he headed until January 1996. Both the FCD and later the SVR had significant participation in transferring funds during this time frame because the staff of the FCD had previously created, developed and oversaw the commercial structures for illegal economies supported by the CPSU.

In 1991 in a dacha outside Moscow, Andrey Vavilov, Konstantin Kagalovsky, and three others developed an economic platform for Russia. Beginning in 1990 Kagalovsky was the Soviet Union's and later Russia's representative on financial matters with the IMF and the World Bank. In November 1991, he became Russia's representative on international financial matters and finally between October 1992 and 1995, he was Russia's representative to the IMF.

On April 4, 1992, Yeltsin issued "The fight against corruption in the public service" decree to provide for maximum transparency of officials and their institutions by providing a listing of their financial obligations, liabilities, securities, income, bank deposits, real estate holdings and their personal property and to prohibit officials from owning businesses. The people with access to FIMACO included senior officers of the Communist Party, Komsomol, state banks, KGB, and the military.

In June 1992, four tranches of IMF money totaling $4 billion were approved for transfer to Russia with the first $1 billion to be sent in June 1992.

A 1993 document signed by a senior deputy to Viktor Gerashchenko, the head of the Central Bank of Russia, forbid disclosure of transfers to FIMACO: "The balance of the investment account of the [Central Bank] in FIMACO shouldn't be disclosed on the balance sheet of the bank."

Coopers & Lybrand performed audits of the Central Bank of Russia during the period of 1993 and 1994, discovered FIMACO, and comdemned its activities. The IMF and the World Bank did not receive the Russian Central Bank's audits for 1993 and 1994.

In 1995, Jules Muis, a Dutch auditor formerly with Ernst & Young that became a vice-president and controller for the World Bank, had his World Bank staff target Russia with audits because of dealings between government officials and consulting firms "where doubts have been raised". Since auditing Russian operations became the World Bank's most critical concern, Donald Strombom, a former procurement chief at the World Bank who later established the International Development Business Consultants and was an advisor to the Russian Ministry of Economy which was headed by Yevgeny Yasin, stated, "Obviously the Bank would not like to shut down operations in Russia." In June 1995 James Wolfensohn, who later became a president of the World Bank, wrote a memo that spot audits would occur using the in-house staff at the World Bank. According to Raghavan Srinivasan who was the chief procurement adviser at the World Bank, "We want to put the fear of God in them."

Felipe Turover Chudínov, a senior intelligence officer with the foreign-intelligence directorate of the KGB, alleged that $15 billion of IMF funds had been funneled through Switzerland, Liechtenstein and Caribbean countries as black cash or obschak to support Kremlin friendly operations and companies. Turover maintained that since the Russian state bank responsible for foreign operations, VEB, had severe economic hardship during the collapse of the Soviet Union and that Russia had taken on all Soviet republics' foreign debts of the Soviet Union which caused Russia to claim it was bankrupt in 1991, VEB's accounts were frozen on January 1, 1992, because Russia had no more money to spend. Turover said that this prevented the typical Cold War cash flows through VEB to pro Kremlin operations and companies and caused, instead, schemes to be established. In 1992, Turover stated that he was mandated to negotiate with Russia's creditors. According to Turover, the Lugano based , which had been the overseas branch of Banco Ambrosiano, was chosen to run Russian black cash schemes and to maintain commodities and barter schemes while VEB was closed because "We needed a very small bank wih a very dirty reputation."

From July 1996 to March 1997, Vladimir Putin was head of Russia's presidential property management department and was responsible for both the former Soviet Union's property and the Communist Party's property worth hundreds of billion-dollars after a Yeltsin decree that became effective on 11 December 1996. Turover stated that Putin created schemes involving Joint Ventures, LLCs, and JSCs as front companies in order to claim large stakes in the transfer of state property to other persons and entities: for example, in East Germany, he fraudulently leased the huge cultural center of Russia in Berlin to a company for almost nothing but the company then leased the building for a very large amount. Turover alleged that Putin pocketed the money that the company received from the expensive lease. Because of this very large loss of assets, Russia needed over $300 billion in foreign investments and demanded even more IMF money during 1998 and 1999 in order to not declare bankruptcy in the spring of 1999. However, IMF officials did not approve additional IMF money for Russia.

A key prospective witness in improper financial affairs was Lyubov Tarasova who was a senior auditor for the Central Bank of Russia and worked for the "Unicom" auditing firm which had been established on 20 August 1991 and was responsible for "checking the correctness of the documentation and the essence of business transactions that are in doubt", but was stabbed to death in her apartment in Moscow on 15–16 October 1997.

In 1998, Edmond Safra was a key FBI witness to a $4.8 billion money laundering scheme involving IMF money, his Republic National Bank of New York, his Republic National Bank of New York (Suisse) in Geneva, Mikhail Kasyanov and Vladimir Putin. He also provided evidence to the Geneva prosecutor Bertrand Bertossa. In mid July 1998, IMF money transfers of $22 billion to Russia were approved which were negotiated by John Odling-Smee of the IMF and Anatoly Chubais of Russia. According to la Repubblica, an account in Safra's Bank of New York received $21.4 billion between 27 July 1998 and 24 August 1998. Turover stated that the scheme would not have occurred without the Russian Finance Minister Mikhail Kasyanov's approval. Safra told British press that a "contract had been put on his life" and that he feared that Russian mafia would kill him.

Fitch Ratings estimated $136 billion had been looted from Russia between 1993 and 1998 and Lloyd's of London estimated $200 billion to $500 billion had been looted from Russia between 1993 and 1998. In August 1999, the Russian national police (MVD) concluded that large sums had left Russia and, according to intelligence sources, an estimated $350 billion had been looted from Russia during the 1990s which led Fritz Ermarth, a former CIA analyst for Russia in the 1990s, to state that "We have outright criminals at one end, but at the other end we call them statesmen."

FIMACO's existence was disclosed by Russia's chief prosecutor Yuri Skuratov in February 1999 when Skuratov stated about $50 billion was transferred from the Central Bank to FIMACO and then out of Russia including IMF funds between 1993 and 1998 and that he had given to Carla del Ponte, the Prosecutor General of Switzerland, a list of about twenty names which had received a total of $40 billion of the IMF money in accounts at Swiss banks. Soon afterwards, FSB chief Vladimir Putin attacked Skuratov with a campaign which included a video where Skuratov allegedly has sex with two prostitutes. The video which was released to the public in February 1999 led to Skuratov's dismissal on 2 April 1999.

On July 20, 1999, the IMF directors received the July 9, 1999, PricewaterhouseCoopers (PWC) report about FIMACO's activities. Following two 6 August 1999 Le Monde articles "Le FMI et la Russie" and "Comment la Russie detournait l'argent du FMI" which were critical of the relationships among the International Monetary Fund (IMF), the World Bank, and the Russian Central Bank, both John Odling-Smee, who was director of the European II department at the IMF, and Michel Camdessus, who was the managing director of the IMF from 16 January 1987 to 14 February 2000, responded with a 5 August 1999 letter and a 19 August 1999 Le Monde article respectively. PWC performed three audits "PricewaterhouseCoopers report on relations between the Central Bank of Russia and the Financial Management Company Ltd (FIMACO)" posted on the IMF website on 5 August 1999, "PricewaterhouseCoopers report on the funds transferred to the Central Bank of Russia by the IMF in July 1998, and the use, by the Central Bank of Russia, of those funds between July 1 and September 1, 1998" posted on the IMF website on August 17, 1999, "PricewaterhouseCoopers report on the statistics compiled by the Central Bank of Russia for the IMF in the period from January 1, 1996 to September 1, 1998" posted on the IMF website on 17 August 1999, but these three audits were removed from the IMF website on 30 September 1999. On 31 August 2000, the IMF published annual totals of money transferred to the Russia.

In July 2000 because of the central banks of both Russia and Ukraine lied about their reserves, the IMF/World Bank required that all central banks must publish their annual financial statements and have outside auditors review those statements using internationally accepted standards.

Mikhail Khodorkovsky's Yukos Oil conglomerate received some of the money and he gave Viktor Gerashchenko chairmanship of Yukos for the help Khodorkovsky received from Gerashchenko.

Reports by Swiss and German intelligence implicated numerous persons in the Russian mafia through 's Vienna, Austria based Nordex and Boris Birshtein's Zurich Switzerland  based Seabeco AG, KGB, FSB, and others in the scheme to move billions away from the Soviet Union and into a secret economy. Some of the funds were sent to the United States through Semyan "Sam" Kislan from Odessa, Michael Cherney and Lev Cherney using the United States firm Newtel Company and Alexander Smolensky's Stolichny Bank. Russian prosecutors had previously tried to implicate Birshtein, Veselovsky, Luchansky, and others of illegally money laundering Communist Party funds.

On 15 December 2011, the Frankfurt am Main prosecutor's office and German criminal authorities named Leonid Reiman as a suspect in a 1990s money laundering scheme involving Commerzbank, his longtime attorney Jeffrey Galmond, and four employees of Commerzbank. The case had begun as an investigation into the looting of Russia during the 1990s.

In the 2015 report "Dark Matter" which took into account the very large net errors and omissions (NEO) for Russian capital flight during the looting of Russia in the 1990s, the Russian capital flight tracked with the United Kingdom's inflows.

In a 2004 interview of Russia's IMF director Alexey Mozhin by Andrei Denisov of Vremya Novostei about the IMF money transferred on 22, 23, 24 and 24 July 1998 and 14 August 1998 and the subsequent locations of the money, Mozhin cites the Central Bank of Russia's PricewaterhouseCoopers audit. In a 31 August 1999 interview with Libération, Michel Camdessus, the managing director of IMF, refused to call the flight of capital a theft and dismissed any money laundering, but was "worried" that Russia had lied to the IMF about the state of its reserves. In early September 1999, Patrice Delozière, who is a Paris-based representative of the Central Bank of Russia at Eurobank, told Libération that "the PricewaterhouseCoopers audit was only provisional" The stolen IMF funds caused the Russian financial crisis of 1998 which began on 17 August 1998.

See also
 Corruption in Russia
 Kroll Inc.
 Philippines Cronyism

Notes

References

Books and journals

External links
 Bohlen, Celestine (July 30, 1999). Secrecy by Kremlin Financial Czars Raises Eyebrows. The New York Times. Retrieved December 8, 2020. Archived from the original on June 16, 2019.
 Coulloudon, Virginie (July 3, 2003). Putin's Russia: A confusing notion of corruption. Princeton.edu. Archived from the original on October 15, 2015.

Companies of Jersey
Corruption in Russia
Economic history of Russia
Political scandals
Financial scandals
Money laundering
Communist Party of the Soviet Union